Harry Cook Jackson (July 23, 1915 in Columbus, Georgia – February 12, 2000) was an American politician (Democratic Party).

Life
Jackson graduated from Auburn University and received a Bachelor of Science degree in Mechanical Engineering. After graduation he began working as an engineer. In 1952, he became a lawyer.

From 1961 to 1973, he was a member of the Senate of Georgia. During this time he held the post of president pro tempore for two terms. In 1974, he ran unsuccessfully for a nomination for the Democratic candidate in the Georgia gubernatorial election. In August 1978, he won the Democratic primary for the Columbus, Georgia mayoral election over incumbent Jack P. Mickle, who had sought the nomination for a second four-year term. Jackson won the next mayoral election and held the office from 1979 to 1982. Jackson was from 1985 a member of the Board of Directors of the Georgia Ports Authority, and was elected in September 1994 as its Chairman.

References

Mayors of Columbus, Georgia
1915 births
2000 deaths